Libya was a colony of Fascist Italy located in North Africa, in what is now modern Libya, between 1934 and 1943. It was formed from the unification of the colonies of Italian Cyrenaica and Italian Tripolitania, which had been Italian possessions since 1911.

From 1911 until the establishment of a unified colony in 1934, the territory of the two colonies was sometimes referred to as "Italian Libya" or Italian North Africa (Africa Settentrionale Italiana, or ASI). Both names were also used after the unification, with Italian Libya becoming the official name of the newly combined colony. It had a population of around 150,000 Italians.

The Italian colonies of Tripolitania and Cyrenaica were taken by Italy from the Ottoman Empire during the Italo-Turkish War of 1911-1912, and run by Italian governors. In 1923, indigenous rebels associated with the Senussi Order organized the Libyan resistance movement against Italian settlement in Libya, mainly in Cyrenaica. The rebellion was put down by Italian forces in 1932, after the so-called "pacification campaign", which resulted in the deaths of a quarter of Cyrenaica's population. In 1934, the colonies were unified by governor Italo Balbo, with Tripoli as the capital.

During World War II, Italian Libya became the setting for the North African Campaign. Although the Italians were defeated there by the Allies in 1943, many of the Italian settlers still remained in Libya. Libya was administered by the United Kingdom and France until its independence in 1951, though Italy did not officially relinquish its claim until the 1947 Paris Peace Treaty.

History

Conquest

Italian efforts to colonize Libya began in 1911, and were characterized initially by major struggles with Muslim native Libyans that lasted until 1931. During this period, the Italian government controlled only the coastal areas. Between 1911 and 1912, over 1,000 Somalis from Mogadishu, the then capital of Italian Somaliland, served in combat units along with Eritrean and Italian soldiers in the Italo-Turkish War. Most of the Somali troops remained in Libya until they were transferred back to Italian Somaliland in preparation for the invasion of Ethiopia in 1935.

After the Italian Empire's conquest of Ottoman Tripolitania (Ottoman Libya), in the 1911–12 Italo-Turkish War, much of the early colonial period had Italy waging a war of subjugation against Libya's population. Ottoman Turkey surrendered its control of Libya in the 1912 Treaty of Lausanne, but fierce resistance to the Italians continued from the Senussi political-religious order, a strongly nationalistic group of Sunni Muslims. This group, first under the leadership of Omar Al Mukhtar and centered in the Jebel Akhdar Mountains of Cyrenaica, led the Libyan resistance movement against Italian settlement in Libya. Italian forces under Generals Pietro Badoglio and Rodolfo Graziani waged punitive pacification campaigns using chemical weapons, mass executions of soldiers and civilians and concentration camps. One-quarter of Cyrenaica's population of 225,000 people died during the conflict. After nearly two decades of suppression campaigns the Italian colonial forces claimed victory.

In the 1930s, the policy of Italian Fascism toward Libya began to change, and both Italian Cyrenaica and Tripolitania, along with Fezzan, were merged into Italian Libya in 1934.

Pacification campaigns

In 1923, indigenous rebels associated with the Senussi Order organized the Libyan resistance movement against Italian settlement in Libya. The rebellion was put down by Italian forces in 1932, after the so-called "pacification campaign", which resulted in the deaths of a quarter of Cyrenaica's population of 225,000. Italy committed major war crimes during the conflict, including the use of illegal chemical weapons, episodes of refusing to take prisoners of war and instead executing surrendering combatants, and mass executions of civilians. Italian authorities committed ethnic cleansing by forcibly expelling 100,000 Bedouin Cyrenaicans, almost half the population of Cyrenaica, from their settlements, slated to be given to Italian settlers.

The Italian occupation also reduced livestock numbers, killing, confiscating or driving the animals from their pastoral land to inhospitable land near the concentration camps. The number of sheep fell from 810,000 in 1926 to 98,000 in 1933, goats from 70,000 to 25,000 and camels from 75,000 to 2,000.

From 1930 to 1931, 12,000 Cyrenaicans were executed and all the nomadic peoples of northern Cyrenaica were forcibly removed from the region and relocated to huge concentration camps in the Cyrenaican lowlands. Fascist regime propaganda proclaimed the camps as hygienic and efficiently run oases of modern civilization. However in reality the camps had poor sanitary conditions and an average of about 20,000 Beduoins, together with their camels and other animals, crowded into an area of one square kilometre. The camps held only rudimentary medical services, with the camps of Soluch and Sisi Ahmed el Magrun with an estimated 33,000 internees having only one doctor between them. Typhus and other diseases spread rapidly in the camps as the people were physically weakened by meagre food rations and forced labour. By the time the camps closed in September 1933, 40,000 of the 100,000 total internees had died in the camps.

Territorial agreements with European powers

The colony expanded after concessions from the British colony of Sudan and a territorial agreement with Egypt. The Kufra district was nominally attached to British-occupied Egypt until 1925, but in fact, remained a headquarters for the Senussi resistance until conquered by the Italians in 1931. The Kingdom of Italy at the 1919 Paris "Conference of Peace" received nothing from German colonies, but as a compensation Great Britain gave it the Oltre Giuba and France agreed to give some Saharan territories to Italian Libya.

After prolonged discussions through the 1920s, in 1935 under the Mussolini-Laval agreement Italy received the Aouzou strip, which was added to Libya. However, this agreement was not ratified later by France.

In 1931, the towns of El Tag and Al Jawf were taken over by Italy. British Egypt had ceded Kufra and Jarabub to Italian Libya on December 6, 1925, but it was not until the early 1930s that Italy was in full control of the place. In 1931, during the campaign of Cyrenaica, General Rodolfo Graziani easily conquered Kufra District, considered a strategic region, leading about 3,000 soldiers from infantry and artillery, supported by about twenty bombers.  Ma'tan as-Sarra was turned over to Italy in 1934 as part of the Sarra Triangle to colonial Italy by the Anglo-Egyptian Condominium, who considered the area worthless  and so an act of cheap appeasement to Benito Mussolini's attempts at an empire. During this time, the Italian colonial forces built a World War I–style fort in El Tag in the mid-1930s.

World War II

After the enlargement of Italian Libya with the Aouzou Strip, Fascist Italy aimed at further extension to the south. Indeed Italian plans, in the case of a war against France and Great Britain,  projected the extension of Libya as far south as Lake Chad and the establishment of a broad land bridge between Libya and Italian East Africa. During World War II, there was strong support for Italy from many Muslim Libyans, who enrolled in the Italian Army. Other Libyan troops (the Savari [cavalry regiments] and the Spahi or mounted police) had been fighting for the Kingdom of Italy since the 1920s. A number of major battles took place in Libya during the North African Campaign of World War II. In September 1940, the Italian invasion of Egypt was launched from Libya.

Starting in December of the same year, the British Eighth Army launched a counterattack called Operation Compass and the Italian forces were pushed back into Libya.  After losing all of Cyrenaica and almost all of its Tenth Army, Italy asked for German assistance to aid the failing campaign

With German support, the lost Libyan territory was regained during Operation Sonnenblume and by the conclusion of Operation Brevity, German and Italian forces were entering Egypt. The first Siege of Tobruk in April 1941 marked the first failure of Rommel's Blitzkrieg tactics. In 1942 there was the Battle of Gazala when the Axis troops finally conquered Tobruk and pushed the defeated British troops inside Egypt again. Defeat during the Second Battle of El Alamein in Egypt spelled doom for the Axis forces in Libya and meant the end of the Western Desert Campaign.

In February 1943, retreating German and Italian forces were forced to abandon Libya as they were pushed out of Cyrenaica and Tripolitania, thus ending Italian jurisdiction and control over Libya.

The Fezzan was occupied by the Free French in 1943. At the close of World War II, the British and French collaborated with the small new resistance. France and the United Kingdom decided to make King Idris the Emir of an independent Libya in 1951.

Libya would finally become independent in 1951.

Independence 
From 1943 to 1951, Tripolitania and Cyrenaica were under British military administration, while the French controlled Fezzan.  Under the terms of the 1947 peace treaty with the Allies, Italy relinquished all claims to Libya. There were discussions to maintain the province of Tripolitania as the last Italian colony, but these were not successful.

Although Britain and France had intended to dividing the nation between their empires, on November 21, 1949, the UN General Assembly passed a resolution stating that Libya should become independent before January 1, 1952. On December 24, 1951, Libya declared its independence as the United Kingdom of Libya, a constitutional and hereditary monarchy.

Colonial administration

In 1934, Italy adopted the name "Libya" (used by the Greeks for all of North Africa, except Egypt) as the official name of the colony made up of the three provinces of Cyrenaica, Tripolitania and Fezzan). The colony was subdivided into four provincial governatores (Commissariato Generale Provinciale) and a southern military territory (Territorio Militare del Sud or Territorio del Sahara Libico):

Tripoli Province, capital Tripoli.
Benghazi Province, capital Benghazi.
Darnah Province, capital Derna.
Misurata Province, capital Misrata.
Southern Military Territory, capital Hun

The general provincial commissionerships were further divided into wards (circondari). On 9 January 1939, a decree law transformed the commissariats into provinces within the metropolitan territory of the Kingdom of Italy. Libya was thus formally annexed to Italy and the coastal area was nicknamed the "Fourth Shore" (Quarta Sponda). Key towns and wards of the colony became Italian municipalities (comune) governed by a podestà.

Governors-General of Libya

Italo Balbo 1 January 1934 to 28 June 1940
Rodolfo Graziani 1 July 1940 to 25 March 1941
Italo Gariboldi 25 March 1941 to 19 July 1941
Ettore Bastico 19 July 1941 to 2 February 1943
Giovanni Messe 2 February 1943 to 13 May 1943

Demographics

In 1939, key population figures for Italian Libya were as follows:

Population of the main urban centres:

Settler colonialism

Many Italians were encouraged to settle in Libya during the Fascist period, notably in the coastal areas. The annexation of Libya's coastal provinces in 1939 brought them to be an integral part of metropolitan Italy and the focus of Italian settlement.

The population of Italian settlers in Libya increased rapidly after the Great Depression: in 1927, there were just about 26,000, by 1931 44,600, 66,525 in 1936 and eventually, in 1939, they numbered 119,139, or 13% of the total population.

They were concentrated on the Mediterranean coast, especially in the main urban centres and in the farmlands around Tripoli, where they constituted 41% of the city's population, and in Benghazi 35%. Settlers found jobs in the construction boom fuelled by Fascist interventionist policies.

In 1938, Governor Italo Balbo brought 20,000 Italian farmers to settle in Libya, and 27 new villages were founded, mainly in Cyrenaica.

Assimilation policies 

After the campaign of reprisals known as the "pacification campaign", the Italian government changed policy toward the local population: in December 1934, individual freedom, inviolability of home and property, the right to join the military or civil administrations, and the right to freely pursue a career or employment were promised to the Libyans.

In a trip by Mussolini to Libya in 1937, a propaganda event was created where Mussolini met with Muslim Arab dignitaries, who gave him an honorary sword (that had actually been made in Florence) which was to symbolize Mussolini as a protector of the Muslim Arab peoples there.

In January 1939, Italy annexed territories in Libya that it considered Italy's Fourth Shore with Libya's four coastal provinces of Tripoli, Misurata, Bengazi, and Derna becoming an integral part of metropolitan Italy. At the same time indigenous Libyans were granted "Special Italian Citizenship" which required such people to be literate and confined this type of citizenship to be valid in Libya only.

In 1939, laws were passed that allowed Muslims to be permitted to join the National Fascist Party and in particular the Muslim Association of the Lictor (Associazione Musulmana del Littorio). This allowed the creation of Libyan military units within the Italian army. In March 1940, two divisions of Libyan colonial troops (for a total of 30,090 native Muslim soldiers) were created and in summer 1940 the first and second Divisions of Fanteria Libica (Libyan infantry) participated in the Italian offensive against the British Empire's Egypt: 1st Libyan Division and 2nd Libyan Division.

Economy
In 1936, the main sectors of economic activity in Italian Libya (by number of employees) were industry (30.4%), public administration (29.8%), agriculture and fishing (16.7%), commerce (10.7%), transports (5.8%), domestic work (3.8%), legal profession and private teaching (1.3%), banking and insurance (1.1%).

Infrastructure development

Italians greatly developed the two main cities of Libya, Tripoli and Benghazi, with new ports and airports, new hospitals and schools and many new roads & buildings. 

Also tourism was improved and a huge & modern "Grand Hotel" was built in Tripoli and in Bengasi.

The Fascist regime, especially during Depression years, emphasized infrastructure improvements and public works. In particular, Governor Italo Balbo greatly expanded Libyan railway and road networks from 1934 to 1940, building hundreds of kilometers of new roads and railways and encouraging the establishment of new industries and a dozen new agricultural villages. The massive Italian investment did little to improve Libyan quality of life, since the purpose was to develop the economy for the benefit of Italy and Italian settlers.

The Italian aim was to drive the local population to the marginal land in the interior and to resettle the Italian population in the most fertile lands of Libya.
The Italians did provide the Libyans with some initial education but minimally improved native administration. The Italian population (about 10% of the total population) had 81 elementary schools in 1939–1940, while the Libyans (more than 85% of total population) had 97.
There were only three secondary schools for Libyans by 1940, two in Tripoli and one in Benghazi.

The Libyan economy substantially grew in the late 1930s, mainly in the agricultural sector. Even some manufacturing activities were developed, mostly related to the food industry. Building construction increased immensely. Furthermore, the Italians made modern medical care available for the first time in Libya and improved sanitary conditions in the towns.

The most important and largest highway project was the Via Balbia, an east-west coastal route connecting Tripoli in western Italian Tripolitania to Tobruk in eastern Italian Cyrenaica. The last railway development in Libya done by the Italians was the Tripoli-Benghazi line that was started in 1941 and was never completed because of the Italian defeat during World War II.

Archaeology and tourism

Classical archaeology was used by the Italian authorities as a propaganda tool to justify their presence in the region. Before 1911, no archeological research was done in Tripolitania and Cyrenaica. By the late 1920s the Italian government had started funding excavations in the main Roman cities of Leptis Magna and Sabratha (Cyrenaica was left for later excavations because of the ongoing colonial war against Muslim rebels in that province). A result of the Fascist takeover was that all foreign archaeological expeditions were forced out of Libya, and all archeological work was consolidated under a centralised Italian excavation policy, which exclusively benefitted Italian museums and journals.

After Cyrenaica's full 'pacification', the Italian archaeological efforts in the 1930s were more focused on the former Greek colony of Cyrenaica than in Tripolitania, which was a Punic colony during the Greek period. The rejection of Phoenician research was partly because of anti-Semitic reasons (the Phoenicians were a Semitic people, distantly related to the Arabs and Jews). Of special interest were the Roman colonies of Leptis Magna and Sabratha, and the preparation of these sites for archaeological tourism.

Tourism was further promoted by the creation of the Tripoli Grand Prix, a racing car event of international importance.

Contemporary relations 

After independence, most Italian settlers still remained in Libya; there were 35,000 Italo-Libyans in 1962. However, the Italian population virtually disappeared after the Libyan leader Muammar Gaddafi ordered the expulsion of remaining Italians (about 20,000) in 1970. Only a few hundred of them were allowed to return to Libya in the 2000s. In 2004, there were 22,530 Italians in Libya.

Italy maintained diplomatic relations with Libya and imported a significant quantity of its oil from the country.  Relations between Italy and Libya warmed in the first decade of the 21st century, when they entered co-operative arrangements to deal with illegal immigration into Italy. Libya agreed to aggressively prevent migrants from sub-Saharan Africa from using the country as a transit route to Italy, in return for foreign aid and Italy's successful attempts to have the European Union lift its trade sanctions on Libya.

On 30 August 2008, Gaddafi and Italian Prime Minister Silvio Berlusconi signed a historic cooperation treaty in Benghazi. Under its terms, Italy would pay $5 billion to Libya as compensation for its former military occupation. In exchange, Libya would take measures to combat illegal immigration coming from its shores and boost investments in Italian companies. The treaty was ratified by Italy on 6 February 2009, and by Libya on 2 March, during a visit to Tripoli by Berlusconi. Cooperation ended in February 2011 as a result of the Libyan Civil War which overthrew Gaddafi. At the signing ceremony of the document, Italian Prime Minister Silvio Berlusconi recognized historic atrocities and repression committed by the state of Italy against the Libyan people during colonial rule, stating: "In this historic document, Italy apologizes for its killing, destruction and repression of the Libyan people during the period of colonial rule." and went on to say that this was a "complete and moral acknowledgement of the damage inflicted on Libya by Italy during the colonial era".

See also

 List of governors-general of Italian Libya
 Italian invasion of Libya
 Italian Libya Railways
 Tripoli Grand Prix
 Frontier Wire (Libya)
 Italian Libyans
 Massacres during the Italo-Turkish War
 Aozou Strip
 Italian Libyan Colonial Division
 1st Libyan Division Sibelle
 2 Libyan Division Pescatori
 Savari
 Spahis

Notes

References

Bibliography
 
  
 Chapin Metz, Helen, ed., Libya: A Country Study. Washington: GPO for the Library of Congress, 1987.
 Del Boca, Angelo. Gli italiani in Libia. Vol. 2. Milano, Mondadori, 1997.
 Sarti, Roland. The Ax Within: Italian Fascism in Action. Modern Viewpoints. New York, 1974.
 Smeaton Munro, Ion. Through Fascism to World Power: A History of the Revolution in Italy. Ayer Publishing. Manchester (New Hampshire), 1971. 
 Tuccimei, Ercole. La Banca d'Italia in Africa, Foreword by Arnaldo Mauri, Collana storica della Banca d'Italia, Laterza, Bari, 1999.
 Taylor, Blaine. Fascist Eagle: Italy's Air Marshal Italo Balbo. Montana: Pictorial Histories Publishing Company, 1996.

External links
 Photos of Libyan Italians and their villages in Libya
  Italian colonial railways built in Libya
  Italian Tripolitania in early 1930s

 
Libya
Former Italian-speaking countries
World War II occupied territories
Former colonies in Africa
Libya
1910s in Libya
1920s in Libya
1930s in Libya
1940s in Libya
Italy–Libya relations
1911 establishments in Africa
1943 disestablishments in Africa
Client states of Fascist Italy
Former countries of the interwar period